William B. Britton (January 8, 1829December 19, 1910) was an American merchant and Republican politician.  He served one term in the Wisconsin State Assembly, representing Rock County, and was a Union Army officer throughout the American Civil War.

Biography
Britton was born on January 8, 1829, in Monmouth County, New Jersey. In 1855, he moved to Janesville, Wisconsin. Britton was a merchant by trade. He died on December 19, 1910.

Military career
Early on in the American Civil War, Britton enlisted in the Union Army. Soon after, he was commissioned an officer and assigned to the 8th Wisconsin Infantry Regiment. Britton eventually achieved the rank of colonel and assumed command of the regiment. Engagements he participated in include the Battle of Jackson, Mississippi, the Red River Campaign and the Battle of Nashville.

Later, Britton became a colonel with what is now the Wisconsin Army National Guard.

Political career
Britton was a member of the Assembly in 1883. Previously, he had been a member of the common council of Janesville in 1874 and 1875. He was a Republican.

References

External links

Politicians from Janesville, Wisconsin
Republican Party members of the Wisconsin State Assembly
Wisconsin city council members
People of Wisconsin in the American Civil War
Union Army colonels
Military personnel from Wisconsin
National Guard (United States) colonels
American merchants
1829 births
1910 deaths
Burials in Wisconsin
19th-century American politicians
Wisconsin National Guard personnel
19th-century American businesspeople